The Meiko Nishi Ohashi roadway bridges are two cable-stayed bridges, completed in 1985 and 1997, crossing the port of Nagoya in Japan.  Their pylons are A-shaped and painted bright red.

References

Cable-stayed bridges in Japan
Transport in Nagoya
Bridges completed in 1985
Bridges completed in 1997
Buildings and structures in Nagoya
1985 establishments in Japan
1997 establishments in Japan